Mainesburg is an unincorporated community in Tioga County, Pennsylvania, United States. Mainesburg has a post office with ZIP code 16932, which opened on January 27, 1830.

References

Unincorporated communities in Tioga County, Pennsylvania
Unincorporated communities in Pennsylvania